Dudley Henry Eden Stanhope, 9th Earl of Harrington (13 January 1859 – 13 November 1928), was a British peer.

He was the son of Charles Stanhope, 7th Earl of Harrington, and Elizabeth Still de Pearsall. He succeeded in the earldom on the death of his childless brother Charles on 5 February 1917.

Family
Lord Harrington married Kathleen Wood, daughter of Joseph Carter Wood, on 26 April 1883. They had three children:

Lady Kathleen Florence Mary Stanhope
Charles Joseph Leicester Stanhope, 10th Earl of Harrington (9 October 1887 – 16 November 1929)
Lieutenant Talbot FitzRoy Eden Stanhope (23 November 1896 – 9 May 1915)

Lord Harrington died on 13 November 1928 at age 69.

References

Book cited

External links

1859 births
1928 deaths
9
Dudley
Younger sons of earls